is a Japanese manga series written by Yamato Koganemaru (first 31 chapters) and Hiroyuki Yatsu (onwards) and illustrated by Namoshiro Tanahashi. It was serialized in Kodansha's shōnen manga magazine Weekly Shōnen Magazine from November 2006 to December 2008, with its chapters collected in 11 tankōbon volumes. A second series, Hammer Session! In High School, was serialized in the same magazine from May to November 2010, with its chapters collected in three volumes. An 11-episode television drama adaptation was broadcast from July to September 2010.

Media

Manga
Written by Yamato Koganemaru (until chapter 31) and Hiroyuki Yatsu (chapter 31–96), and illustrated by Namoshiro Tanahashi, and Hammer Session! was serialized in Kodansha's shōnen manga magazine Weekly Shōnen Magazine from November 15, 2006, to December 10, 2008. Kodansha collected its chapters in 11 tankōbon volumes, released from February 16, 2007, to January 16, 2009.

A second series, Hammer Session! In High School, was serialized in the same magazine from May 26 to November 2, 2010; an three-chapter extra story, titled , was serialized in Magazine Special from June 19 to September 18 of the same year. Kodansha collected its chapters (including the Akasagi-hen chapters) in three tankōbon volumes, released from August 17, 2010, to December 17, 2010.

Volume list
Hammer Session!

Hammer Session! In High School

Drama
An 11-episode television drama adaptation was broadcast on TBS from July 10 to September 18, 2010. The series stars Mokomichi Hayami as Goro Hachisuka and Mirai Shida as Kaede Tachibana. The series' theme song is "Liar" by Spyair.

References

External links
  
 

Japanese drama television series
Kodansha manga
TBS Television (Japan) dramas
Teaching anime and manga
Shōnen manga